Fredrik van der Horst (born 2 December 1989) is a Norwegian speed-skater. He is the grandson of Hjalmar "Hjallis" Andersen.

He represented Norway at the 2010 Winter Olympics in Vancouver.

References

External links 
 
 

1989 births
Norwegian male speed skaters
Speed skaters at the 2010 Winter Olympics
Olympic speed skaters of Norway
Norwegian people of Dutch descent
Living people
21st-century Norwegian people